Cloverdale is a town in Cloverdale and Warren townships, Putnam County, in the U.S. state of Indiana. The population was 2,172 at the 2010 census.

History
Cloverdale was laid out in 1839. The town was so named on account of the abundance of clover and dales near the original town site. A post office has been in operation at Cloverdale since 1836.

Geography
Cloverdale is located at  (39.515345, -86.802559).

Demographics

2010 census
As of the census of 2010, there were 2,172 people, 885 households, and 608 families living in the town. The racial makeup of the town was 97.4% White, 0.6% African American, 0.3% Native American, 0.3% Asian, 0.2% from other races, and 1.2% from two or more races. Hispanic or Latino of any race were 0.9% of the population.

There were 885 households, of which 32.1% had children under the age of 18 living with them, 50.5% were married couples living together, 12.5% had a female householder with no husband present, 5.6% had a male householder with no wife present, and 31.3% were non-families. 27.5% of all households were made up of individuals, and 12.4% had someone living alone who was 65 years of age or older. The average household size was 2.41 and the average family size was 2.90.

The median age in the town was 42.2 years. 22.8% of residents were under the age of 18; 8.5% were between the ages of 18 and 24; 22.6% were from 25 to 44; 29.6% were from 45 to 64; and 16.5% were 65 years of age or older. The gender makeup of the town was 48.3% male and 51.7% female.

2000 census
As of the census of 2000, there were 2,243 people, 901 households, and 613 families living in the town. The racial makeup of the town was 97.28% White, 0.45% African American, 0.31% Native American, 0.18% Asian, 0.04% Pacific Islander, 0.31% from other races, and 1.43% from two or more races. Hispanic or Latino of any race were 0.98% of the population.

There were 901 households, out of which 33.1% had children under the age of 18 living with them, 53.3% were married couples living together, 10.3% had a female householder with no husband present, and 31.9% were non-families. 25.9% of all households were made up of individuals, and 13.0% had someone living alone who was 65 years of age or older. The average household size was 2.49 and the average family size was 3.00.

In the town, the population was spread out, with 27.5% under the age of 18, 7.7% from 18 to 24, 27.9% from 25 to 44, 23.4% from 45 to 64, and 13.5% who were 65 years of age or older. The median age was 37 years. For every 100 females, there were 88.8 males. For every 100 females age 18 and over, there were 88.4 males.

The median income for a household in the town was $36,402, and the median income for a family was $42,917. Males had a median income of $33,561 versus $20,857 for females. The per capita income for the town was $16,982. About 4.0% of families and 7.4% of the population were below the poverty line, including 9.4% of those under age 18 and 6.2% of those age 65 or over.

Infrastructure
Cloverdale is served by locally owned and based Endeavor Communications, formerly Clay County Rural Telephone Cooperative, which serves over 10,000 members. An alternative to the local phone company for internet service, PDS Wireless is locally owned an operated and serving Cloverdale and some outlying areas.

References

External links

Town website

Towns in Putnam County, Indiana